Lemon Drop Kid (foaled May 26, 1996) is an American Thoroughbred racehorse and sire. Best known for winning the 1999 Belmont Stakes, he was also the champion older horse of 2000 after winning the Brooklyn, Suburban, Whitney Handicaps and the Woodward Stakes.

Background
Lemon Drop Kid is a bay horse with no white markings bred in Kentucky by William S. Farish III & William S. Kilroy. He was sired by Kingmambo an American-bred horse who raced in Europe before returning to the United States to become a highly successful breeding stallion. His dam Charming Lassie, a daughter of Seattle Slew, went on to produce Statue of Liberty, a colt which won the Coventry Stakes in 2002. Charming Lassie's dam was Lassie Dear, an influential broodmare whose other descendants have included A.P. Indy, Summer Squall, Duke of Marmalade and Wolfhound.

Racing career
As a two-year-old in 1998 Lemon Drop Kid showed himself to be a very promising colt with a victory in the Grde I Belmont Futurity in September.

Lemon Drop Kid won a minor race at Gulfstream Park in February 1999 but then appeared to have his limitations exposed when he was well-beaten in the Blue Grass Stakes and then finishing ninth to Charismatic in the Kentucky Derby. The colt missed the Preakness Stakes but returned on 5 June for the Belmont takes, a race which featured Charimatics attempt to become the first winner of the Triple Crown in more than 20 years. Ridden by José A. Santos he came from well off the pace to overtake Charismatic in the stretch and held off the rallying outsider Vision And Verse to win by a head. After the race, most of the attention went to Charismatic, who sustained a career-ending injury, rather than to the winner.

In August Lemon Drop Kid followed up in the Travers Stakes, beating Vision And Verse again, with Menifee and Cat Thief among the other beaten horses. Santos commented "I hope he gets a little credit now. After the Belmont all eyes were on Charismatic but Lemon Drop Kid won the race. He had to prove he's the real deal. In my heart he's one of the best".

In 2000 Edgar Prado took over from Santos as Lemon Drop Kid's regular jockey. He recorded Grade I wins in the Brooklyn Handicap, Suburban Handicap, Whitney Handicap and Woodward Stakes. At the end of the year he was named U.S. Champion Older Male Horse.

Stud career
Lemon Drop Kid was pensioned from stud duty in 2021. He will continue to live at Lane's End Farm in Versailles, Kentucky, where he stood for his entire breeding career.  His first crop of foals in 2005 produced three stakes winners.  His second crop in 2006 produced three more stakes winners, including the filly Lemons Forever, the longshot winner of the 2006 Kentucky Oaks. Other Grade I winners have included Somali Lemonade, Richard's Kid (Pacific Classic), Cannock Chase        (Canadian International Stakes), Beach Patrol (Arlington Million, Joe Hirsch Turf Classic), Lemon Pop (February Stakes) and Santa Teresita (Santa Maria Handicap).

Through his daughter Lemons Forever, Lemon Drop Kid is the broodmare sire of multiple Gr.I winner Forever Unbridled and Gr.I winner Unbridled Forever.

Lemon Drop Kid's notable progeny include:
 Beach Patrol- Winner of the Arlington Million, Secretariat Stakes, Joe Hirsch Turf Classic
 Lemons Forever- Winner of the Kentucky Oaks
 Somali Lemonade- Winner of the Diana Stakes, Gallorette Handicap, Jessamine Stakes, 
 Cannock Chase-Winner of the Canadian International Stakes, Tercentenary Stakes, Huxley's layer
 Da Big Hoss- Winner of the Elkhorn Stakes, John B. Connally Turf Cup, American St. Leger Stakes, Belmont Gold Cup Invitational, Kentucky Turf Cup Stakes (twice)
 Richard's Kid- Winner of the Pacific Classic Stakes (twice), Goodwood Stakes, Cougar II Handicap (twice), San Antonio Handicap
 Santa Teresita- Winner of the Santa Maria Handicap 
 Romantic Vision- Winner of the Spinster Stakes, Locust Grove Stakes 
 Cosmonaut- Winner of the Fort Marcy Stakes, Arlington Handicap (twice), Golden Gate Fields Handicap, Tampa Bay Stakes 
 Citronnade- Winner of the Gamely Stakes, Dahlia Stakes, Beverly Hills Handicap, Santa Ana Handicap, San Gorgonio H.
 Kiss the Kid- Winner of the Cliff Hanger Stakes, Appleton Stakes, Fort Lauderdale Stakes 
 Kid Cruz- Winner of the Dwyer Stakes, Excelsior Stakes, John B. Campbell Stakes, Private Terms Stakes 
 Inspector Lynley- Winner of the Saranac Stakes, Tampa Bay Stakes
 Kid Friendly- Winner at Saratoga and Penn National Stakes nominated
 Lemon Pop - Winner of the February Stakes in Japan.

Pedigree

References

External links
Lemon Drop Kid's pedigree, with photo
 Video at YouTube of Lemon Drop Kid's win in the 1999 Belmont Stakes

1996 racehorse births
Racehorses bred in Kentucky
Racehorses trained in the United States
Belmont Stakes winners
Thoroughbred family 3-l